Pleshakov is a Russian masculine surname, its feminine counterpart is Pleshakova. It may refer to
Alexey Pleshakov (born 1954), Russian politician
Sergei Pleshakov (born 1957), Russian field hockey player 
Vladimir Pleshakov (born 1957), Russian field hockey goalkeeper, twin brother of Sergei
Yuriy Pleshakov (born 1988), Ukrainian-Russian football striker

Russian-language surnames